Rosalba Patiño (born 1960) is a Colombian chess player, Colombian Women's Chess Champion (1977).

Biography
From the begin of 1970s to begin of 1980s, Rosalba Patiño was one of Colombia's leading female chess players. In 1977, in Bogotá she won Colombian Women's Chess Championship. In 1978, in Cali Rosalba Patiño participated in Women's World Chess Championships Central American Zonal tournament and ranked in 5th place. In 1980, in Córdoba she shared 3rd-4th place in 1st Pan American Women's Chess Championship.

Rosalba Patiño played for Colombia in the Women's Chess Olympiads:
 In 1974, at second board in the 6th Chess Olympiad (women) in Medellín (+0, =3, -4),
 In 1976, at first reserve board in the 7th Chess Olympiad (women) in Haifa (+2, =3, -3),
 In 1978, at second board in the 8th Chess Olympiad (women) in Buenos Aires (+5, =4, -3),
 In 1980, at first reserve board in the 9th Chess Olympiad (women) in Valletta (+5, =2, -3).

References

External links
 
 
 

1960 births
Living people
Colombian female chess players
Chess Olympiad competitors
20th-century chess players